You Ought to Be in Pictures is a 1940 Warner Bros. Looney Tunes short film directed by Friz Freleng. The cartoon was released on May 18, 1940, and stars Porky Pig and Daffy Duck.

The film combined live-action and animation, and features live-action appearances by Leon Schlesinger, writer Michael Maltese, animator Gerry Chiniquy and other Schlesinger Productions staff members. The title comes from the popular 1934 song "You Oughta Be in Pictures" by Dana Suesse and Edward Heyman, which plays in the beginning of the film.

In 2016, it was shortlisted for the 1941 Retro-Hugo Award for Best Dramatic Presentation, Short Form.

Plot 

An animator is seen drawing Porky Pig, after Porky is drawn the animator looks at a clock and realizes that it's time for the studio's lunch break at 12 'o clock. The animator advises all the staff that it is lunch break. Quickly the staff runs out of the building.   
 
The Porky drawing comes to life after a Daffy Duck drawing  hanging on a frame wants to talk to Porky. Daffy tells Porky that he wants to be the top star in the studio. To this end, he persuades Porky to resign from the Schlesinger studios to pursue a career in feature films as Bette Davis' co-star {"Three grand a week!"}. Porky goes to Leon Schlesinger and asks to have his contract torn up. Schlesinger reluctantly agrees and wishes Porky the best of luck. Once Porky is out of earshot, Schlesinger assures the audience that Porky will be back.

Porky spends the rest of the film trying to get into the lots and sets of the Warner Bros studio, with little success. After several failures in convincing the security guard (played by Michael Maltese, voiced by Mel Blanc) to let him in, dressing up as Oliver Hardy to gain access, (until the guard realizes the real Hardy already entered the studio) and inadvertently interrupting the shooting of a dance film, he decides to see if Schlesinger will take him back.

He returns to Schlesinger's office after frantically dodging his cartoon car in and out of live-action Los Angeles traffic, only to see Daffy doing a wild audition to become the new star of Warner Bros. cartoons, openly disparaging Porky. Porky then takes Daffy with him to another room, where he beats Daffy up. After this, he hurriedly runs into Schlesinger's office to beg for his job back. Schlesinger, laughing heartily and saying he knew he would return, reveals that he did not really rip up Porky's contract, and happily tells him to get back to work. Porky gladly thanks him and runs back into the animation paper that he was in when the short started. Daffy, wrapped in bandages after being beaten up by Porky but still not quite having learned his lesson, again attempts to persuade Porky to resign and work with Greta Garbo, only to get splattered with a tomato, which irritates him.

Cast 
 Mel Blanc (voice) as Porky Pig and Daffy Duck
 Leon Schlesinger as himself
 Fred Jones as the animator
 Chuck Jones as himself (cameo)
 Bob Clampett as himself (cameo)
 Michael Maltese as security guard
 Gerry Chiniquy as director
 Henry Binder and Paul Marin as stagehands

Production 

On this occasion, Daffy Duck is seen as a much more self-centered individual who shows willingness to do anything to get what he wants, whether it was money or fame, instead of being seen as a trouble-inducing screwball. This, in turn, is indirectly a foreshadowing of the character he would later become, particularly in Rabbit Fire, and onward until he was returned to his original screwball personality in the late 2010s. It was also Friz Freleng's first film back at the studio after being at MGM for two years. The film has become one of the better known shorts made by Warner Bros, and in 1994 was voted #34 of the 50 Greatest Cartoons of all time by members of the animation field.

 First Daffy Duck cartoon directed by Friz Freleng.
 In a real-life parallel of the storyline, the short was directed by Friz Freleng, who had just returned to Schlesinger after a stint as a director at MGM's cartoon division.
 As noted, many staff members have cameos in this short:
 Leon Schlesinger — appears as himself
 Chuck Jones — one of the crowd rushing out during the lunch break
 Bob Clampett — another one of the Termite Terrace employees rushing frantically off to lunch
 Michael Maltese — the studio security guard
 Gerry Chiniquy — studio director calling for quiet
 Henry Binder, Paul Marin — stagehands also calling for quiet. Binder is also the stagehand throwing Porky off the set
 This is the second longest Looney Tunes cartoon ever made in the Golden Age of Animation, running for nine minutes and 45 seconds. The longest Looney Tunes cartoon of all is the 1942 Bob Clampett (coincidentally seen in this picture in a cameo) cartoon Horton Hatches the Egg, beating You Ought to be in Pictures by three seconds.
 Because the animation unit could not access location sound recording equipment, all of the live-action footage was shot silent. The voices had to be dubbed in later (which is why most of them were dubbed by Mel Blanc, except for Leon Schlesinger).
 To keep the short on-budget, relatively few special effects were used to marry the animation and live action. Where possible, the crew simply took still pictures of the office background and had them enlarged and placed directly on the animation stand.
 Stock footage from the 1936 Western California Mail was used in the sequences of Porky driving through the backlot.
 Despite being in black and white, this short was shown regularly on Looney Tunes on Nickelodeon, particularly during the Nick at Nite version.
 In 1995, the film was computer colorized and became a regular part of the Cartoon Network rotation. The film could also be seen in its original black and white form on the network's installment show Late Night Black and White.

Reception 
Animation historian Jerry Beck writes, "Predating Who Framed Roger Rabbit by several decades — in fact, it's credited with inspiring the 1988 film — You Ought to Be in Pictures is one of the most memorable of the black-and-white-era Porky Pig cartoons. It's also one of the funniest."

Home media
You Ought to Be in Pictures is available on Looney Tunes Golden Collection: Volume 2, on Disc 4, on Looney Tunes Platinum Collection: Volume 2, on Disc 1 and also on Porky Pig 101, Disc 4. Prior to that, it had been included as part of the 1985 VHS release Warner Bros. Cartoons Golden Jubilee 24-Karat Collection: Porky Pig's Screwball Comedies.

References

External links

 
 

1940 films
1940 short films
1940 comedy films
1940 animated films
1940s children's comedy films
1940s children's animated films
1940s English-language films
1940s Warner Bros. animated short films
American children's animated comedy films
American animated short films
American black-and-white films
Metafictional works
Looney Tunes shorts
Daffy Duck films
Porky Pig films
Anthropomorphic animals
Films about real people
Animation based on real people
Films about films
Films about animation
Films about actors
Films about Hollywood, Los Angeles
Films set in Burbank, California
Animated films set in Los Angeles
Films set in studio lots
Films set in 1940
Short films with live action and animation
Short films directed by Friz Freleng
Films produced by Leon Schlesinger
Films scored by Carl Stalling
Warner Bros. Cartoons animated short films